The following highways are numbered 100B:

United States
 County Road 100B (Clay County, Florida)
 New York State Route 100B
 Vermont Route 100B

See also
List of highways numbered 100